Rosal is a surname principally of Spanish origin. It may be related to the Spanish word for rose. Notable people with the surname include:

Angelita Rosal (born 1951), American table tennis player
Gregorio Rosal (1947–2011), Filipino revolutionary
Guillermo Rosal (born 1945), Spanish bobsledder
Maria Vicenta Rosal (1815–1886), Guatemalan missionary and advocate of women’s rights
Noel Rosal (born 1964), Filipino politician
Patrick Rosal (born 1969), Filipino American poet
Rosa Rosal (born 1931), also known as Florence Danon Gayda, Filipino actor

Other uses
Bay Area Rosal, an American indoor soccer team

See also
El Rosal (disambiguation)